Oleksandr Martynenko may refer to:

 Oleksandr Martynenko (cyclist) (born 1989), Ukrainian cyclist
 Oleksandr Martynenko (journalist) (born 1960), Ukrainian journalist